Ahmed Darwish (born 2 June 1981) is an Egyptian sports shooter. He competed in the men's 50 metre rifle prone event at the 2016 Summer Olympics.

References

External links
 

1981 births
Living people
Egyptian male sport shooters
Olympic shooters of Egypt
Shooters at the 2016 Summer Olympics
Place of birth missing (living people)
21st-century Egyptian people